Frederick of Denmark (13 April 1532–7 October 1556) was the youngest son of Frederick I of Denmark and Sophie of Pomerania. He was the Prince-Bishop of Hildesheim and Bishop of Schleswig. Frederick was born on April 11 1532 as the youngest son of Frederick I of Denmark and Sophie of Pomarania. As the youngest son, he was proclaimed the Prince-Bishop of Hildesheim and Bishop of Schleswig. He died on 7 October 1556 unmarried. He probably died of natural causes although not much is known about him.

References

16th-century Lutheran bishops
Prince-Bishops of Hildesheim
Bishops of Schleswig
House of Oldenburg in Denmark
Danish princes
Norwegian princes
1532 births
1556 deaths
Danish Lutheran bishops
Lutheran bishops and administrators of German prince-bishoprics
Sons of kings